Valencian Sign Language, or LSV, is a sign language used by deaf people in the Valencian Community, Spain. It is closely related to Catalan Sign Language (LSC); they are variously described as similar languages or as dialects of a single language. 

Valencia was the first Spanish autonomous community to support the use of sign language in the Statute of Autonomy, but does not specify which sign language is to be used. The use of LSV in Valencia has, however, diminished and is restricted to administrative communications and occasional usage in the media.

Learning LSV 
 "¡A Signar!", Interactive CD-ROM . FESORD. València 1999. .

References 

 "Sígname": para aprender Lengua de Signos en la Comunidad Valenciana., FESORD. Basic, medium and high levels. Valencia 2000. Several authors.  .
 "Spanish Sign Languages Survey", Steven Parkhurst and Dianne Parkhurst. SIL International, 2006. Before published in Spanish in 2001 as Un estudio lingüístico: Variación de las lenguas de signos en España, in the Revista Española de Lingüística de Lengua de Signos (RELLS), as a study from the Promotora Española de Lingüística (PROEL).
 "Lexical Comparisons of Signed Languages and the Effects of Iconicity," Steven Parkhurst. Work Papers of the Summer Institute of Linguistics, University of North Dakota Session, vol. 47 (2003). SIL International.
 "Signolingüística", FESORD. Valencia 1999. Several authors.  .

External links
 FESORD CV (Federació de Persones Sordes de la Comunitat Valenciana)
 Information about sign languages on Spain, from Promotora Española de Lingüística (PROEL).

Sign languages of Spain
Valencian culture
Languages of Spain